The 2012 African Women's Handball Cup Winners' Cup was the 28th edition, organized by the African Handball Confederation, under the auspices of the International Handball Federation, the handball sport governing body. The tournament was held from April 21–29, 2012 in Beni Khiar, Nabeul and Tazarka, Tunisia, contested by 6 teams and won by Atlético Petróleos de Luanda of Angola.

Schedule & results

Final standings

External links
 Results - cahbonline

References

African Women's Handball Cup Winner's Cup
2012 African Handball Cup Winners' Cup